Erzsébet Vasvári-Pongrátz (28 June 1954 – November 2022) was a Hungarian sports shooter. She competed in the mixed skeet event at the 1992 Summer Olympics.

Career
Listed in Olympians Who Won a Medal at the World Shooting Championships (2–2–5 1989 Montecatini Terme bronze: skeet and skeet team (competed as Erzsébet Vasvári); 1990 Moskva gold: skeet team, silver: skeet (competed as Erzsébet Vasvári); 1991 Perth bronze: skeet and skeet team (competed as Erzsébet Vasvári); 1994 Fagnano Olona gold: skeet team (competed as Erzsébet Vasvári); 1995 Lefkosia silver: skeet team (competed as Erzsébet Vasvári); 2002 Lahti bronze: skeet team (competed as Erzsébet Vasvári).

References

External links
 

1954 births
2022 deaths
Hungarian female sport shooters
Olympic shooters of Hungary
Shooters at the 1992 Summer Olympics
Sport shooters from Budapest